Gaetano Cima (1805 in Cagliari – 1878 in Cagliari) was an Italian architect, exponent of the neoclassical movement.

Biography
Gaetano Cima was born in Cagliari, Sardinia by an upper-middle-class family. 

Gaetano Cima died in Cagliari in 1878. 

There is only one known photograph of Gaetano Cima alive. (Collection Pisu).

Education
He studied architecture in Turin, and later in Rome at the Accademia delle Belle Arti, where he had as professors Luigi Canina and Luigi Poletti, famous Italian neoclassical architects.

He came back to Sardinia when he completed his studies, working as civil engineer in the Cadastre Office in Cagliari.

Architectural Works In Sardinia
He later assumed a professorship at the local university, while conducting projects in association with former classmate and then colleague architect Carlo De Candia; together they beatified the waterfront of Cagliari with buildings presenting lushes balconies and patios, with views to the ocean at the best Ligurian style.

Image gallery

Bibliography
 Salvatore Naitza. Architettura dal tardo '600 al classicismo purista. Cagliari, Ilisso, 1992. 

1805 births
1878 deaths
19th-century Italian architects
Architects from Sardinia
People from Cagliari
Academic staff of the University of Cagliari